Transistor is the fourth studio album by American rock band 311, released on August 5, 1997 by Capricorn Records. The album saw a change in musical style as fewer songs feature rapping in comparison to the band's previous albums.

Upon its release, Transistor received negative reviews from critics, who felt it was overlong and self-indulgent. Retrospectively, however, the album has been more positively received, and was certified platinum by the RIAA.

Music
Clocking in at 67:59 and with twenty-one tracks (or twenty-three, counting both hidden tracks), Transistor is 311's longest album and, until their 2017 album Mosaic, was their only album to contain more than sixteen tracks. Transistor was originally intended to be a double album, but all songs were instead placed onto one disc. Nick Hexum admitted that doing too many songs in not enough time for Transistor was a mistake.

While still utilizing their alternative rock sound in many songs, Transistor saw 311 moving away from their hip hop-influenced sound of their previous albums for more of a reggae-influenced sound, as shown in songs such as "Prisoner", "Inner Light Spectrum", "Running", "Rub a Dub", and "Stealing Happy Hours". Although, their rap rock style is still present in some songs, such as "Galaxy", "No Control", "Tune In", "Starshines", and "Borders". Transistor also contains elements of dub, space rock and stoner rock.

Reception

Transistor received a mixed review from Allmusic, who commented that "a project of this magnitude is almost doomed to fall on its face, and Transistor nearly does," and noted there were enough good songs for a 30 to 40 minute album, but had too much filler. They nominated the title track as the only Track Pick from the album. The album has received criticism from The A.V. Club, who says "With 21 songs spread out over 68 minutes, the record has taken plenty of critical punishment for its excessive length alone," and calls it a "joyless, tedious exercise in white-boy reggae, white-boy rap, white-boy dub and white-boy rock," concluding that the band could suffer a "Spin Doctors-style career combustion" in the future. Entertainment Weekly also panned the album, stating that it features "some of the weakest rhymes and derivative white-bread dub in recent memory" and concluded that the band did not know "the thin line between experimentation and self-indulgence". Rolling Stone criticized the album, saying it was "trying too hard to expand their sonic horizons", and commented how they seem to unwillingly change their musical style.

Retrospective reviews
In contrast, the album was retrospectively received positively by Consequence of Sound, comparing it to The Beatles' album Sgt. Pepper's Lonely Hearts Club Band. Commenting that "the singles aren't what make Transistor great. It's the deep cuts that you play over and over again, trying to catch the meaning", they conclude that the album is "one of a kind". Over time, Transistor has developed a cult following and become a fan favorite, eventually leading to the band performing the album in its entirety on August 6, 2011 in front of over 10,000 fans. This was done at their very own Pow Wow Festival, created to commemorate the 14th anniversary of the album.

Track listing

Personnel
Credits adapted from album’s liner notes.

311
 Nick Hexum – vocals , rhythm guitar, programming
 SA Martinez – vocals , scratches
 Chad Sexton – drums, percussion, programming
 Tim Mahoney – lead guitar
 Aaron Wills – bass

Production
311 – producer
Scotch Ralston – producer, engineer, mixing
John Ewing Jr. – assistant engineer
Wade Norton – technical support
Joe Gastwirt – mastering

Charts

Album

Singles

References

311 (band) albums
1997 albums
Capricorn Records albums